Events from the year 1853 in Germany.

Incumbents
 King of Bavaria – Maximilian II
 King of Hanover – George V
 King of Prussia – Frederick William IV
 King of Saxony – Frederick Augustus II

Events
 20 July – The Jade Treaty is signed between Prussia and Oldenburg. Prussia is ceded territory which allows it to construct a major naval base at Wilhelmshaven
 25 October – Neue Pinakothek in Munich opened.

Births
 1 January – Karl von Einem, German general, Prussian Minister of War (died 1934)
 9 January – Henning von Holtzendorff, German admiral (died 1919)
 10 January – John Martin Schaeberle, German/American astronomer (died 1924)
 14 March – Max Saenger, German obstetrician and gynecologist (died 1903)
 4 July – Ernst Otto Beckmann, German chemist (died 1923)
 12 July - Carl Schotten, German chemist (died 1910)
 26 July - Martin Segitz, German politician (died 1927)
 2 September – Wilhelm Ostwald, German chemist (died 1932)
 20 September – Joseph Kürschner, German editor and publisher (died 1902)
 23 September – Fritz von Below, German general (died 1918)
 16 September – Albrecht Kossel, German physician, recipient of the Nobel Prize in Physiology or Medicine (died 1927)
 22 November – Clemens von Ketteler, German diplomat killed during the Boxer Rebellion (died 1900)

Full date unknown
Otto Wissig, Protestant German parson and author (died 1933)

Deaths
 19 January – Karl Faber, German historian (born 1773)
 15 February – August, Prince of Hohenlohe-Öhringen, German general (born 1784)
 28 April – Ludwig Tieck, German writer (born 1773)
 15 December – Georg Friedrich Grotefend, German epigraphist and philologist (born 1775)
 Undated – Meta Forkel-Liebeskind, German writer and scholar (born 1765)

References

 
Years of the 19th century in Germany
Germany
Germany